Hallyuworld is a complex that has a major role in the production and consumption of contemporary Korean culture. It is being constructed by Gyeonggi-do, one of the biggest Provinces of Korea.

The objective of Hallyuworld is to make regional Hallyu more globalized and create an organized system of Korean culture. It will be completed in Goyang-si, Korea by 2011.  The main facilities will be a theme park, hotels, commercial facilities, and the content production facilities.

In 2013, South Korea's Ministry of Culture, Sports and Tourism announced a US$635.18 million project to support the construction of a much awaited concert arena dedicated to hosting K-pop performances, with them aim of attracting more tourists and to support the spread of Hallyu.

 The new concert hall being built by the end of 2016 will house over 20,000 seats and it will cost 200 billion won.

References

 http://eng.e-hallyu.com/eng/default.asp  (official & English)
 https://web.archive.org/web/20090517041542/http://www.h-wood.co.kr/index_eng.php

South Korean culture
Buildings and structures in Gyeonggi Province